The Nakayama Himpai (Japanese 中山金杯) is a Grade 3 horse race for Thoroughbreds aged four and over run in January over a distance of 2000 metres at Nakayama Racecourse.

The race was first run in 1952 and was promoted to Grade 3 level in 1984. The race was initially contested over 2600 metres before being moved down to 2000 metres in 1961.

Winners since 2000 

 The 2002 race took place at Tokyo Racecourse.

Earlier winners

 1984 - Dokan Yashima
 1985 - Suzu Parade
 1986 - Kushiro King
 1987 - Tochino Nishiki
 1988 - Iron Ciro
 1989 - Nishino Mirror
 1990 - Mejiro Monterey
 1991 - Carib Song
 1992 - Tosho Falco
 1993 - Sekitai Ryu O
 1994 - Hidaka Hayato
 1995 - Sakura Laurel
 1996 - Best Tie Up
 1997 - Best Tie Up
 1998 - Gourmet Frontier
 1999 - Silent Hunter

See also
 Horse racing in Japan
 List of Japanese flat horse races

References

Turf races in Japan